Cristopher Antonio Núñez González (born 8 December 1997) is a Costa Rican professional footballer who plays as a midfielder for Greek Super League club Lamia.

References

1997 births
Living people
Costa Rican footballers
Costa Rican expatriate footballers
Costa Rican expatriate sportspeople in Greece
Expatriate footballers in Greece
Liga FPD players
Super League Greece players
C.S. Cartaginés players
PAS Lamia 1964 players
Association football midfielders